Tarzan is a Disney media franchise that commenced in 1999 with the theatrical release of the film Tarzan.

Films

Produced

Tarzan (1999) 
Tarzan is a 1999 American animated adventure musical film produced by Walt Disney Feature Animation and released by Walt Disney Pictures. The 37th Disney animated feature film, it is based on the story Tarzan of the Apes by Edgar Rice Burroughs, and is the only major motion picture version of the story Tarzan property to be animated.

Tarzan & Jane (2002) 
Tarzan & Jane is a Disney direct-to-video film released on July 23, 2002, sequel to the 1999 animated feature Tarzan, and uses three unaired episodes of the film's corresponding television series, The Legend of Tarzan. Tarzan II, a follow-up to the original film, was released in 2005. The film is set one year after the events of the first film.

Tarzan II (2005) 
Tarzan II (also known as Tarzan II: The Legend Begins) is a 2005 direct-to-video animated film and follow-up to the 1999 Walt Disney Feature Animation film Tarzan. It was released on June 14, 2005. Taking place during Tarzan's youth, it follows Tarzan's adventure to discover who he really is.

Live action remake 
in September 2022 Disney and Moving Picture Company wanted to make the 1999 remake of Tarzan before Jungle Cruise (film).

Cancelled

Tarzan III 
In 2004, DisneyToon Studios announced that a second sequel titled Tarzan III, that film focused on Terk and Tantor leading their homes in London with Tarzan and Jane with their son named Paxton. Stan Phillips is attached to direct and write the story to the film. In 2006, however, it was cancelled by John Lasseter for unknown reasons.

Television

The Legend of Tarzan
The Legend of Tarzan is an American animated television series created by The Walt Disney Company in 2001, based on the Tarzan character created by Edgar Rice Burroughs. The series aired on ABC from July 13 to September 7, 2002 as part of its "Disney's One Saturday Morning" lineup. The Legend of Tarzan picks up where the 1999 feature film left off.

Broadway musical

Tarzan
The original Broadway musical production of Tarzan opened in 2006, directed and designed by Bob Crowley with choreography by Meryl Tankard. The production ran for 35 previews and 486 performances. Subsequently, the show has been staged in several foreign countries and by regional theatres.

Video games

Disney's Tarzan

Disney's Tarzan (also known as Tarzan Action Game) is a platform game developed by Eurocom and published by Sony Computer Entertainment for the PlayStation console in 1999. Konami published the game for its Japanese release. It was also released on the PC and Game Boy Color in 1999, and Nintendo 64 in 2000.

Tarzan: Untamed

Tarzan: Untamed (known as Tarzan: FreeRide in Europe) is a 2001 action-adventure video game released by Ubisoft Montreal for the PlayStation 2 and was a launch title for the GameCube.

Tarzan Jungle Tumble
Tarzan Jungle Tumble is a 2001 platform game developed and released by Disney Interactive for the PC.

Disney's Tarzan: Return to the Jungle
Disney's Tarzan: Return to the Jungle is a 2002 platform game released by Activision for Game Boy Advance. In this game, Tarzan and Terk are lost, and they have to go back to protect the jungle from Queen La.

Disney's Tarzan Activity Center
Disney's Tarzan Activity Center, a 1999 game which is part of Disney's Activity Center series.

Other appearances
 Tarzan's home, "Deep Jungle", is a playable world in the Disney/Square Enix video game Kingdom Hearts released for PlayStation 2 in 2002. Tony Goldwyn and Brian Blessed were the only cast members to reprise their roles in the game. It does not appear in any subsequent games in the series, save for the game's Final Mix version, due to Square Enix's failure to acquire the required rights from the family of Edgar Rice Burroughs.
 Tarzan, Jane, Tantor, and Terk, in their young forms, appear as playable characters in Disney's Extreme Skate Adventure, developed by Toys for Bob and released for PlayStation 2, GameCube, Xbox and Game Boy Advance in 2003.

Theme park attractions

Tarzan's Treehouse
Tarzan's Treehouse is a walk through attraction at Disneyland and Hong Kong Disneyland. It is styled after the 1999 film Tarzan.

Tarzan Rocks!

Tarzan Rocks! was a musical show that took place in the Theater in the Wild at Disney's Animal Kingdom from 1999 to 2006. It featured rollerskating monkeys along with Tarzan, Jane and Terk. It also featured songs from the Tarzan film by Phil Collins. It was replaced by Finding Nemo – The Musical.

Meet and greets
Tarzan, Jane and Terk all appear at the Disney Parks and Resorts as meetable characters, and can be found in Adventureland, and at Disney’s Animal Kingdom.

Music

Soundtrack
Tarzan: An Original Walt Disney Records Soundtrack is the soundtrack for the 1999 Disney animated film, Tarzan. The songs on the soundtrack were composed by Phil Collins, and the instrumental score by Mark Mancina. The song "You'll Be in My Heart" won both an Oscar and a Golden Globe for Best Original Song and received a Grammy Award nomination for Best Song Written for a Motion Picture, Television or Other Visual Media while the soundtrack album received a Grammy Award for Best Soundtrack Album. For his contribution to the soundtrack, Collins received an American Music Award for Favorite Adult Contemporary Artist.

 "You'll Be in My Heart" 
 "Strangers Like Me"
 "Son of Man"
 "Two Worlds"

Cast and characters

References

External links

 
Walt Disney Studios (division) franchises